Partidul Naţional Liberal may refer to:
 National Liberal Party (Moldova), a political party in the Republic of Moldova
 National Liberal Party (Romania), a centre-right liberal party in Romania